A secret rebate is a kick-back that is made available to some customers or business partners but concealed from others, to the detriment of competition.  The practice is usually illegal under state unfair business practice laws.

California law 
California offers an example of a law banning secret rebates:

Cases interpreting California's provision include Eddins v. Redstone, 134 Cal. App. 4th 290 (2005) and Cleveland v. Viacom Inc., 73 F. App’x 736 (5th Cir. 2003).

See also 
Rebate (disambiguation)
Robinson-Patman Act

References 

Business law